Louisiana elected its members July 8–10, 1828.

See also 
 1828 and 1829 United States House of Representatives elections
 List of United States representatives from Louisiana

1828
Louisiana
United States House of Representatives